Eumeswil is a 1977 novel by the German author Ernst Jünger. The narrative is set in an undatable post-apocalyptic world, somewhere in present-day Morocco. It follows the inner and outer life of Manuel Venator, a historian in the city-state of Eumeswil who also holds a part-time job in the night bar of Eumeswil's ruling tyrant, the Condor. The book was published in English in 1993, translated by Joachim Neugroschel.

Themes
The key theme in the novel is the figure of the Anarch, the inwardly-free individual who lives quietly and dispassionately within but not of society and the world. The Anarch is a metaphysical ideal figure of a sovereign individual, conceived by Jünger. Jünger was greatly influenced by egoist thinker Max Stirner. Indeed, the Anarch starts out from Stirner's conception of the unique (der Einzige), a man who forms a bond around something concrete rather than ideal,<ref>An exposition of the figure of the Anarch through citations from Juenger's Eumeswil.]</ref> but it is then developed in subtle but critical ways beyond Stirner's concept.
 

 

 

 

ReceptionPublishers Weekly'' reviewed the book in 1994: "In this acute if labyrinthine study of a compromised individual, [Jünger telescopes past and present, playing over the sweep of Western history and culture with a dazzling range of allusions from Homer and Nero to Poe and Lenin, displaying his erudition but failing to ignite the reader's engaged interest."

References

External links 
 English Language copy of the book
 Blog discussing and exploring Jünger's anarch through excerpts from Eumeswil
 Association Eumeswil, a Florentine cultural association dedicated to the study of Ernst Jünger's life and works.
 

1977 science fiction novels
1977 German novels
German science fiction novels
German-language novels
Novels by Ernst Jünger
Novels set in Morocco
Post-apocalyptic novels
Novels about time travel